The tanbūra or "Kissar" is a bowl lyre of East Africa and the Middle East. It takes its name from the Persian tanbur via the Arabic tunbur, though this term refers to long-necked lutes. The instrument probably originated in Upper Egypt and the Sudan in Nubia and is used in the Fann At-Tanbura in the Persian Gulf Arab States. It also plays an important role in zār rituals.

According to ethnomusicologist Christian Poché, it has been played in "Egypt, Sudan, Djibouti, North Yemen, Southern Iraq and the Gulf States."

See also 
 Krar

References

External links
 https://web.archive.org/web/20080524061339/http://www.octm-folk.gov.om/meng/instrument_mel02.asp
 The Tambura
The zar and the tumbura cults
Sudanese lyre audio samples

Lyres
Arabic musical instruments
Bahraini musical instruments
Kuwaiti musical instruments
Omani musical instruments
Qatari musical instruments
Somalian musical instruments
Djiboutian musical instruments
Emirati musical instruments
Sudanese musical instruments
Sacred musical instruments